State Route 23 (abbreviated SR 23) is part of Maine's system of numbered state highways, running  from Sidney to Guilford.  It is located in the south-central part of the state, running from southwest to northeast, roughly parallel to Interstate 95 for its entire length.

Route description
SR 23 begins in Sidney at Belgrade Road, which carries SR 8, SR 11 and SR 27.  It runs northward along the eastern side of Messalonskee Lake into the town of Oakland, where it rejoins SR 11 and cuts through downtown.  SR 11 splits off to join SR 137 eastward towards I-95 and Waterville, while SR 23 continues northward, paralleling the Interstate highway as it crosses into Fairfield.  SR 23 crosses over SR 104 and SR 139 as it approaches the Kennebec River, where it intersects with US 201.  The two routes overlap northward for just over two miles into the northwestern corner of the town before SR 23 splits off to the northwest and crosses the river into Canaan.  The road passes through the center of town, briefly overlapping with US 2 and then enters Hartland where it meets SR 43, SR 151, and SR 152.  SR 23 joins SR 43 and SR 152, crossing shortly thereafter into St. Albans where SR 43 departs to the east.  SR 23 and SR 152 continue northward into the small town of Ripley.  SR 23 splits off of SR 152 and joins SR 154 eastbound towards Dexter.  SR 154 abruptly ends after two miles, though, at the intersection with Water Street.  SR 23 continues into Dexter and briefly overlaps SR 7 before turning due north.  SR 23 enters the town of Guilford and ends at the intersection with Water Street (SR 6, SR 15 and SR 16) east of downtown.

History
SR 23 was formed from a previous alignment of SR 24, which included most of its current routing as well as a section between Gardiner and Sidney now covered by other routes.  In 1954, the northern terminus of SR 24 was truncated to its current location in Gardiner.  The SR 24 designation was dropped between Gardiner and Sidney, and the northern section was renumbered to SR 23.

Major intersections

References

023
Transportation in Kennebec County, Maine
Transportation in Somerset County, Maine
Transportation in Penobscot County, Maine
Transportation in Piscataquis County, Maine